Lieutenant-General Sir Percy Henry Noel Lake,  (29 June 1855 – 17 November 1940) served as a senior commander in the British and Indian Armies, and in the Canadian Militia. He served during World War I.

Career
Lake was the son of Lt.-Colonel Percy Godfrey Botfield Lake (1829–1899) and his wife Margaret Phillips of Quebec City. Born at Tenby, Wales, on 29 June 1855, he was brought up in Preston, Lancashire where his father was stationed. He was educated at Preston Grammar School and Uppingham School.

Lake was commissioned as a sub-lieutenant in the 59th Regiment of Foot in 1873, and promoted to lieutenant on 9 August 1873. He fought in the Second Anglo-Afghan War in 1878–79. He was promoted captain on 31 October 1883 and graduated from Staff College in 1884. In 1885 he became Deputy Assistant Adjutant General and Quartermaster General during the Suakin Expedition, Sudan.

Returning home, he served as Staff Captain at Army Headquarters in 1887 and Deputy Assistant Adjutant General (Intelligence) at Army Headquarters in 1888. He went on to be Deputy Assistant Adjutant General at Dublin District in Ireland in 1892, Quartermaster General for the Canadian Militia in 1893 and, on promotion to lieutenant-colonel, Assistant Quartermaster General (Intelligence) at Army Headquarters in India in September 1899. He was appointed a Companion of the Order of the Bath (CB) on 22 August 1902.

After that Lake became Chief Staff Officer for 2nd Army Corps in 1904, Chief of the Canadian General Staff in 1905 and Inspector General of the Canadian Militia in 1908, introducing a number of reforms. He was promoted major-general on 23 March 1905, and appointed a Companion of the Order of St Michael and St George (CMG) in 1905 and Knight Commander (KCMG) in 1908.

Leaving Canada in 1910, he became General Officer Commanding 7th (Meerut) Division in India in 1911 and Chief of the General Staff in India from 1912, having been promoted lieutenant-general in March 1911. In 1913 he was given the colonelcy of the East Lancashire Regiment, which he held until 1920. In January 1916 he was appointed commander-in-chief of the Mesopotamian Force, part of an expeditionary force sent to relieve Sir General Townshend's troops at Kut. 

After preparing for a fresh campaign, in August 1916 Lake returned to England, and was created Knight Commander of the Order of the Bath (KCB) on 1 January 1916. He was given a post in the Ministry of Munitions in May 1917.

Later life
Following the war, Lake formally retired on 20 November 1919. He returned to Canada and lived in Victoria, British Columbia, where he died on 17 November 1940. He was survived by his wife Hester Fanny, whom he had married in 1891. They had no children.

References

Further reading
Barker, A. J., The First Iraq War, 1914–1918: Britain's Mesopotamian Campaign (New York: Enigma Books, 2009), 

 

1855 births
1940 deaths
Graduates of the Staff College, Camberley
British military personnel of the Second Anglo-Afghan War
British Army personnel of the Mahdist War
British Army generals of World War I
Canadian generals
Commanders of the Canadian Army
Canadian Knights Commander of the Order of St Michael and St George
British Army lieutenant generals
Welsh military personnel
59th Regiment of Foot officers
Military personnel from Pembrokeshire
Canadian Knights Commander of the Order of the Bath